General Belgrano originally refers to:

 Manuel Belgrano (1770–1820), Argentine economist, politician and military leader

General Belgrano may also refer to:

Places
 General Belgrano, Buenos Aires, a city in the Buenos Aires Province, Argentina
 General Belgrano Partido, a district of Buenos Aires Province, Argentina
 General Manuel Belgrano, a settlement in Formosa Province, Argentina
 Pueblo General Belgrano, a village and municipality in Entre Ríos Province, Argentina
 Villa General Belgrano, a village in Córdoba Province, Argentina

Ships
 , an Argentine Navy light cruiser, sunk in the Falklands War
 , an Argentine Navy Giuseppe Garibaldi-class cruiser

Other uses
 General Belgrano Bridge, a road bridge in Argentina
 General Manuel Belgrano Railway, one of the main railway lines in Argentina
 General Belgrano de Santa Rosa, an Argentine football club from La Pampa Province

See also 
 
 Belgrano (disambiguation)
 General Belgrano Department (disambiguation)
 Belgrano II Base, Antarctica
 List of ships named ARA General Belgrano